Life in Bunker is a sandbox construction and management simulation game, which was developed by Flox Studios Ltd, and was released on 25 February 2016 for Microsoft Windows, Mac OS, SteamOS and Linux.

Gameplay 
The surface of the earth is uninhabitable, and the player uses several characters to manage resources such as air, food, water, and minerals in an underground bunker to ensure survival until life outdoors can resume. The bunker has four levels so that the player can expand the size of the bunker. The layout is different every time you play. Events such as disease and mechanical failures occur to challenge the player. Characters can specialize in different skills, and need to be replaced by the younger generation when they get old and leave the workforce.

Reception 
The game scored a 3 out of 5 in The Escapist.

References 

2016 video games
Indie video games
Open-world video games
Simulation video games
Strategy video games
Real-time strategy video games
Survival video games
Linux games
MacOS games
Video games developed in Russia
Windows games